Route 125 or Highway 125 can refer to multiple roads:

Canada
 Winnipeg Route 125
 Nova Scotia Highway 125
 Ontario Highway 125
 Prince Edward Island Route 125
 Quebec Route 125

Costa Rica
 National Route 125

India
 National Highway 125 (Uttarakhand)

Italy
 State road 125

Japan
 Japan National Route 125

Mexico
 Mexican Federal Highway 125

United States
 Alabama State Route 125
 Arkansas Highway 125
 California State Route 125
 Colorado State Highway 125
 Connecticut Route 125
 Florida State Road 125 (former)
 County Road 125 (Baker County, Florida)
 County Road 125 (Bradford County, Florida)
 Georgia State Route 125
 Illinois Route 125
 Iowa Highway 125 (former)
 Kentucky Route 125
 Louisiana Highway 125
 Maine State Route 125
 Maryland Route 125
 Massachusetts Route 125
 M-125 (Michigan highway)
 Missouri Route 125
 New Hampshire Route 125
 New Mexico State Road 125
 New York State Route 125
 County Route 125 (Cortland County, New York)
 County Route 125 (Fulton County, New York)
 County Route 125 (Jefferson County, New York)
 County Route 125 (Monroe County, New York)
 County Route 125 (Montgomery County, New York)
 County Route 125 (Niagara County, New York)
 County Route 125 (Onondaga County, New York)
 County Route 125 (Rensselaer County, New York)
 County Route 125 (Seneca County, New York)
 County Route 125 (Steuben County, New York)
 County Route 125 (Tompkins County, New York)
 North Carolina Highway 125
 Ohio State Route 125
 Oklahoma State Highway 125
 Pennsylvania Route 125
 South Carolina Highway 125
 Tennessee State Route 125
 Texas State Highway 125
 Texas State Highway Loop 125 (former)
 Texas State Highway Spur 125
 Farm to Market Road 125
 Utah State Route 125
 Vermont Route 125
 Virginia State Route 125
 Virginia State Route 125 (1924-1928) (former)
 Washington State Route 125
 West Virginia Route 125 (proposed)
 Wisconsin Highway 125

Territories
 Puerto Rico Highway 125
 Puerto Rico Highway 125R